The coat of arms of Ukraine is a blue shield with a gold trident. Officially referred to as the Emblem of the Royal State of Volodymyr the Great, or, colloquially, the tryzub ("trident"), the insignia derives from the seal-trident of Volodymyr the Great, the first Grand Prince of Kyiv. 

The small coat of arms was officially adopted on 19 February 1992, while constitutional provisions exist for establishing the great coat of arms, which is not yet officially adopted. The small coat of arms was designed by Andriy Grechylo, Oleksii Kokhan, and Ivan Turetskyi. It appears on the Presidential Standard of Ukraine. Blue-coloured tridents are considered to be an irregular representation by the Ukrainian Heraldry Society. The greater coat of arms which has not been adopted consists of the small coat of arms and the coat of arms of Zaporizhian Host (Constitution of Ukraine, Article 20).

The trident was not thought of as a national symbol until 1917, when one of the most prominent Ukrainian historians, Mykhailo Hrushevskyi, proposed to adopt it as a national symbol (alongside other variants, including an arbalest, a bow or a cossack carrying a musket, i.e. images that carried considerable historical and cultural and heraldic significance for Ukraine). On 25 February 1918, the Central Rada (parliament) adopted it as the coat of arms of the short-lived Ukrainian People's Republic.

During the Soviet period of 1919–1991 and independence between 1991 and 1992, the state symbols were consistent with the Russian SFSR and the Soviet Union – a hammer and sickle over the rising sun.

Tryzub
The modern "trident" symbol was adopted as the coat of arms of the Ukrainian People's Republic in February 1918, designed by Vasyl Krychevsky. The design has precedents in seals of the Kyivan Rus. The first known archaeological and historical evidence of this symbol can be found on the seals of the Rurik dynasty. However, according to Pritsak, the stylized trident tamga, or seal which was used by Rus rulers such as Sviatoslav I of Kiev and similar tamgas that were found in ruins are Khazar in origin. 

It was stamped on the gold and silver coins issued by Prince Volodymyr the Great (980–1015), who might have inherited the symbol from his ancestors (such as Svyatoslav I Igorevich) as a dynastic coat of arms, and he passed it on to his sons, Svyatopolk I (1015–19) and Yaroslav the Wise (1019–54). The symbol was also found on the bricks of the Church of the Tithes in Kyiv, the tiles of the Dormition Cathedral in Volodymyr, and the stones of other churches, castles, and palaces. There are many examples of it used on ceramics, weapons, rings, medallions, seals, and manuscripts.

Most historians agree that the medieval symbol was not intended as depicting a trident, but rather, was a symbol of the Holy Trinity; it also was most likely a stylized falcon. Depictions of a flying falcon with a Christian cross above its head have been found in Old Ladoga, the first seat of the Kievan Rurik dynasty, of Scandinavian lineage.  Such a falcon, along with a cross are also featured on the coins of Olaf Guthfrithsson, a Viking king of Dublin and Northumbria. 

Falconry has been a royal sport in Europe for centuries. The gyrfalcon (known also as Norwegian falcon) was considered a royal bird and is mentioned (ukr.: рарог) in one of the earliest epics of Ruthenia, the 12th century poem The Tale of Ihor's Campaign.

Later images of the trident ("tryzub") among the Rurikids resemble more a bident or the letter "У", which also in the modern Cyrillic alphabet denotes the sound "u" as in "Ukraine" (though the Cyrillic alphabet at the time did not use this letter individually, using the digraph ОѴ/оу or its monogram Ꙋ instead).

Other uses
The Tryzub is heavily used in the military heraldry to commemorate the participation on the Eastern Front during World War II.  At least 36 units of the Italian Army carry the Tryzub in their Coat of Arms, as they were awarded a Medal for Military Valor during their service on the territory of Ukraine. The Tryzub is the Coat of arms of Zaslawye.  Worth noting is that the Tryzub was also used in conjunction with the Russian tricolour, as the symbol of the anti-communist movement National Alliance of Russian Solidarists in the early 20th century.

Three-fingered salute
A three-fingered hand salute is sometimes used to mimic the Tryzub; as for example in pro-independence demonstrations in the late 1980s and in the logo of the (Ukrainian) Svoboda party.

Historical coats of arms

Kingdom of Ruthenia

The coat of arms for the Kingdom of Ruthenia and Duchy of Galicia–Volhynia has existed since the 12th century. It consisted of a lion on an azure heater shield. The Ruthenian lion first appears in the seal of the Ruthenian king Yurii I, dated to the beginning of the XIV century. There is an image of a monarch on a throne, and on the reverse, an armed horseman holding a shield with a lion on his hind leg, an example of equestrian seals common in Europe at the time. On the seal, there is an inscription in Latin: "Sigillum Domini Georgi Regis Rusie" (Seal of the owner of George-Yuri, King of Ruthenia), on the back: "Sigillum Domini Georgi Ducis Ladimerie" (seal of the owner of George-Yuri, prince of Lodomeria). 

On the seal of his son Lev II, only a lion without a rider is depicted. The animal stands on its hind legs and reverses to the left.

Figures of lions as symbols of Ruthenia are found on the silver coins of the Lithuanian prince Lubart, the last ruler of the Kingdom of Ruthenia (1340–1383), and his son Fedor (1384–1387). We see the same motive on Ruthenian money, the issue of which continued during the reign in Ruthenia of the Polish king Casimir III (1349–1370), the Hungarian king Louis (1370–1372, 1378–1382) and his governor, Prince of Opolsk Vladislav (1372–1378).

After the occupation of Eastern Galicia by the Kingdom of Poland as a result of the Galicia–Volhynia Wars, the coat of arms with many changes was adopted as part of the Ruthenian Voivodeship (Ruthenian Palatine). It was abandoned with partition of Poland and annexation of territory by the Austrian Empire. At the end of World War I and dissolution of Austria-Hungary, the Western Ukrainian People's Republic revived the coat of arms. With the annexation of the West Ukraine by Poland again in 1918 and later the Soviet Union, the gold lion symbol became the coat of arms for the city of Lviv.

Cossack Hetmanate (Cossack with musket)

A Cossack with a musket was an emblem of the Zaporizhian Host and later the state emblem of the Hetmanate and the Ukrainian State. The origin of the emblem is uncertain, while its first records date back to 1592. On the initiative of Pyotr Rumyantsev, the emblem was phased out and replaced by the Russian double-headed eagle in 1767.

A Cossack with a rifle was restored by the Hetman of Ukraine Pavlo Skoropadsky in 1918. The emblem disappeared until in 2005, when it reappeared on the proposed Great Seal of Ukraine.

Designs by Heorhiy Narbut

Designs of the coat of arms of Ukraine by Heorhiy Narbut are projects of the State Coat of Arms of the Ukrainian State and the Great Coat of Arms of the Ukrainian State developed by the Ukrainian artist Heorhiy Narbut in 1918. Heorhiy Narbut took as a basis the national symbols of the hetman state of the Zaporizhzhya Army. On an octagonal blue shield, a Cossack dressed in gold ornamented robes was placed in the center. Above the Cossack's shield rose a golden trident, the sign of Grand Duke Volodymyr. The Cossack was turned to the right, and around his shield was a silver cantush, painted in a floral baroque style. The trident gained popularity in the Ukrainian People's Republic, because it was depicted on the ruble coins introduced in December 1917. The first coin of the Ukrainian People's Republic was 100 rubles. George Narbut used baroque elements and heraldic signs - the trident and coat of arms of the Kyiv Magistrate of the times of the Grand Duchy of Lithuania in the form of a crossbow. So the trident became a popular symbol and eventually turned into a small coat of arms of the Ukrainian People's Republic. Since January 22, 1919, the Trident was also used as the coat of arms of the Western region of the Ukrainian People's Republic. It remained the coat of arms of the hetman state of Pavlo Skoropadskyi, as well as the Directorate of Ukraine.

Grand Duchy of Ruthenia (Archistrategos Mykhaïl)
The importance of the Kyiv region coat of arms with Archangel Michael known as Archistrategos Mykhaïl arose during discussion of the so-called 1658 Hadiach Treaty between the delegation of the Cossack Hetmanate and the Crown of Poland, that foresaw the transformation of the Commonwealth into the Polish–Lithuanian–Ruthenian Commonwealth.

Carpathian Ruthenia (Red bear)

The coat of arms was created after the end of the First World War, when Carpathian Ruthenia (then called Subcarpathian Rus') was transferred from Hungary to the newly created state of Czechoslovakia. It was designed in 1920 by Czech historian . The Ruthenians had been promised autonomy within the new country, and therefore a coat of arms was created for their land.

The coat of arms shows the Ukrainian tinctures (heraldic colours) of blue and gold in its first (dexter) field and a red bear on silver in its second field. The bear is perhaps a symbol of Carpathian wildlife. The horizontal lines (in heraldry called bars) could perhaps have been inspired by the partitions per fess in the coat of arms of Hungary, to which the territory had belonged.

The arms were also used by the short-lived state of Carpatho-Ukraine in 1939, but with the addition of the Ukrainian Tryzub in the uppermost blue field, used previously by the Ukrainian People's Republic. Since the territory is the same for the current Zakarpattia Oblast, the oblast uses the arms as its own minus the trident.

Ukrainian Soviet Socialist Republic

The coat of arms of the Ukrainian Soviet Socialist Republic was adopted on 14 March 1919, by the government of the Ukrainian Soviet Socialist Republic and subsequently modified on 7 November 1928, 30 January 1937, and 21 November 1949. The coat of arms of 1949 is based on the coat of arms of the Soviet Union and features the hammer and sickle, the red star, a sunrise and ears of wheat on its outer rims. The rising sun stands for the future of the Soviet Ukrainian nation, the star as well as the hammer and sickle for the victory of communism and the "worldwide socialist community of states".
The banner bears the Soviet Union state motto ("Workers of the world, unite!") in both the Ukrainian and Russian languages. The name of the Ukrainian SSR is shown only in Ukrainian.

After independence on 24 August 1991, Ukraine retained the Soviet emblem. The next year, in 1992, the emblem was changed to the present coat of arms of Ukraine, the tryzub (trident) coat of arms.

Other variations
Among other notable features are Archistratege Michael the Archangel, Pohoń Ruśka (Ruthenian Pursuer), Three crowns (representing three kings Daniel, Leo and George), Galician jackdaw, Volhynian silver cross pattée at the red field, Podolian gold sun, Chernihiv black eagle, Kharkiv crossed cornucopia and caduceus at the green field.

Greater coat of arms

In 1917, President of the Central Rada Mykhailo Hrushevsky proposed the Great Coat of Arms in the form of a single shield topped by a dove with olive branch. The shield was split five ways. At its center there was a smaller shield depicting a plough as a symbol of productive peaceful work surrounded by ancient state symbols of Ukraine: the princely arms of Volodymyr the Great (tryzub), Litvin Pogon with a golden lion, cossack with musket, the crossbow of Kyiv and the lion of Lviv.

In the current Constitution of Ukraine there is a constitutional provisions for the establishment of a Great Coat of Arms of Ukraine, although it was never officially adopted and was published in various heraldic sources. In this variant, the shield is supported by a lion from the Galician Coat of Arms on the left and a cossack in traditional dress, wielding a musket, the symbol of the Cossack Hetmanate on the right. The Coat of Arms is crowned with the crown of Volodymyr the Great, symbolizing Ukrainian sovereignty and decorated with viburnum and wheat at the bottom.

Since Ukrainian independence in 1991 four attempts by the Ukrainian government to create an official Great Coat of Arms have failed. The official adoption of the Great Coat of Arms has to be endorsed (in a second reading) by a two-thirds majority vote (300 votes) in the Verkhovna Rada, the Ukrainian parliament.

On 25 August 2020 the Verkhovna Rada instructed the Shmyhal Government to get an official Great Coat of Arms of Ukraine adopted in time for the 30th anniversary of Ukrainian independence. On the day of the 30th anniversary of Ukrainian independence, 24 August 2021, the Verkhovna Rada adopted a law in its first reading that establishes a official Great Coat of Arms of Ukraine with 257 votes.

See also

 Armorial of Ukraine
 National symbols of Ukraine
 Symbols of the Rurikids
 Columns of Gediminas
 Cossack with musket
 Flag of Ukraine
 Trishula, Trident of Poseidon

References

Further reading 
 Леонід К. В справі герба України. — Київ : Видавництво „Шлях“, 1918. — 8 с.
 Все про світ. Країни. Прапори. Герби: енциклопедичний довідник / [відповідальний за випуск М. Ілляш]. — К. : Школа, 2001. — 622 с. .
 Ґречило А. Українська територіальна геральдика. — Львів, 2010. — 280 с.
 Гай-Нижник П. П. З історії створення державного герба та печатки Української держави Павла Скоропадського // Архіви України. — № 6, 2001
 Ґречило А. Становлення українських національно-державних символів у 1917—1920 роках // Записки наукового товариства ім. Шевченка. — Львів, 2006. — Т. CCLII. — С. 114—142.

External links

 Official specification (Ukrainian)
 Verkhovna Rada of Ukraine Resolution № 2137-XII of 19.02.1992 on the Coat of Arms of Ukraine (Ukrainian) 

 
Ukraine
Ukraine
National symbols of Ukraine